Marloes Frieswijk (born March 25, 1996 in Heerenveen) is a Dutch Korfball star.

References

1996 births
Living people
Sportspeople from Heerenveen
Dutch korfballers
21st-century Dutch people